Acinetobacter pseudolwoffii is a bacterium from the genus of Acinetobacter which has been isolated from water with sediments from a forest creek.

References

Moraxellaceae
Bacteria described in 2019